Antonio Leonelli  or Antonio da Crevalcore (c. 1438–1441, in Crevalcore – after 1515 or 1525, in Bologna) was an Italian painter, mainly of still-life painting and some sacred subjects. Leonalli is considered by many to have trained in Ferrara, based on the similarities between his painting style, and works by other known Ferrarese painters working in Bologna at the time.

Biography
He was registered as a painter in Bologna in 1461. A Holy Family (1493) by Leonelli was destroyed during the bombing of Berlin in 1945. he is known by documents to have painted for the church of San Petronio.

References

Year of death missing
15th-century Italian painters
Italian male painters
16th-century Italian painters
Italian still life painters
Painters from Bologna
Year of birth uncertain